Steve Robson is an English songwriter and record producer who has sold in excess of 138 million records around the world. He has written and produced 12 No. 1 UK/US singles, 38 No. 1 UK/US albums and a further 41 top 5 UK/US albums and singles. He is Grammy-nominated for Rascal Flatts ”What Hurts the Most”, which also won BMI Song of the Year and a Nashville Songwriters Association International "10 Songs I Wish I'd Written" award, He has won Ivor Novello Awards and Brit Awards for Take That's “Shine” and has had two more Ivor Novello nominations for Olly Murs' “Troublemaker” and "Dance with Me Tonight".

Early life
Born in Jarrow, Robson is a classically trained instrumentalist on piano, violin, clarinet, and saxophone. Whilst living in the North East, he spent his time playing in bands and working on various TV shows. He moved to London in his late teens to continue his TV career and there began his songwriting career. He still lives in London.

Career

Career highlights include No. 1 singles for Olly Murs ("Troublemaker", "Dance with Me Tonight", "Please Don't Let Me Go"), Take That ("Shine"), Rascal Flatts ("These Days", "What Hurts the Most", "My Wish", "I Won't Let Go"), Leona Lewis ("Run"), Helping Haiti ("Everybody Hurts"), Busted" ("You Said No"), Westlife ("Queen of My Heart) and No. 1 albums for Little Mix, One Direction, Olly Murs, 5 Seconds of Summer, Robbie Williams, Take That, Ella Henderson, John Newman, Leona Lewis, Westlife, Blue, Faith Hill, Wynonna Judd, Carrie Underwood, James Morrison, and Natalie Imbruglia.

Discography

2020

2019

2018

2017

2016

2015

2014

2013

2012

2011

2010

2009

2008

2007

2006

2005

2004

2003

2002

2001

2000

1999

1998

References

Living people
English record producers
English songwriters
People from Jarrow
Writers from Tyne and Wear
Musicians from Tyne and Wear
Year of birth missing (living people)